The Music School of Rhodes (Μουσικό Σχολείο Ρόδου) is a school located on Rhodes Island in the Koskinou region of Greece, which specialises in teaching music. The current head teacher of the school is Nikitas Nikolaos Chrysohos. It opened in September 1993 with only 28 pupils and 10 teachers. At the end of summer 2013, the school was recorded to have a roll of 231 pupils and 68 teachers. The school is made up of 12 sections of which 8 are for pupils in the first 3 years of high school and 4 for the use of  pupils in the last 3 years of high school. Although the school mainly specialises in music, other subjects are also taught to pupils such as maths, physics, literature and languages. The school is open from Monday to Friday between the hours of 08:00 to 3:15.

History

The opening of the music school came about due to the demand for a music school from the Music School's Arts Committee (a department of the Education Ministry). When the school was founded in 1993, it had only 10 teachers: P. Giannakitsa (Philologist/Literature Teacher), T. Tsimpouri (Piano), E. xatzinikolaou (Piano), K. Loukas (Mathematician), B. Kattavenakis (Musician), H. Anastasiadis (Lyra), S. Perselis (Lyra), G. Paragios (Lyra), E. Statha (Piano), I. Dermitzakis (Violin) and N. Zervos (HeadMaster).

The announcement of the creation of the school received lots of negative reactions from the public. Many people felt uninterested or suspicious about the idea. Others were doubtful at the idea of a school which was so different from any other schools, specialising in one particular subject.

First Year

During the school's first year of operation, the school had problems regarding the housing of students. For the first few days of operation, the housing for the school was situated in Rodini park. However it was later transferred to the 6th Lykeio of Rhodes (also known as Ikokiriki). Conflict between the Music School of Rhodes and the admission of the 6th school of Rhodes caused the Music school to transfer to an area called 'Therme'.

Second Year

After the problems with the housing and conflict with the 6th school of Rhodes, the music school was eventually moving slowly back on track. During the second year of operation, the school building was divided into 3 sections for smoother running of teaching. In this case, there are 2 sections of the building that was provided to the first year pupils and the last section was allocated to the use of second years, since there were 46 1st year pupils and 25 2nd year pupils at the time. However, the housing problem was still one of the major issues to the school, owing to several numbers of insufficient classrooms, the teachers have spent most of their time teaching at the kitchen or in the yard if the condition allowed. In addition to the smooth running, more teachers have joined the School: M.Pavlidou, M.Sotiraki (Philologist/Literature Teacher), H.Xatzinikolaou (Physicist), G.Stintixaki (German Language), E.Volonaki (Piano), A.Santoriniou (Piano), E.Ioannidou, P.Kouvaras, G.Kotis, S.Xatzinikolaou, Xatzipapas (Theatre), T.Athanasopoulos (Art).

Third Year

As the time moved onto the third year of operation, the school has found the way to temporarily solve its housing problem. As a result, the location of the school was transferred from 'Therme' to “Gold Court” at Afantou area. As the school was into a more stable situation and the buildings was in good condition, the 4 sections of the building were allocated as 1 section for the 1st years, 2 sections for 2nd years (as there are more pupils) and finally 1 section for the 3rd years. As a success achievement of the year, the school won the 2nd award at the 1st PanHellenic music competition for their Byzantine Choir and 1st place in both piano and European Choir.

Recent
The overall structure of the high school has been completed with the addition of 4th, 5th and 6th years, the school has gained support from EU funds for their new building at 'Asgourou' (which is their current location ). As a massive improvement at the end of the year the school has participated in the 2nd PanHellenic music competition and has taken four 1st places in different areas.

Events
The music school regularly hosts events and festivals for the public to attend. The events that are held vary from operas to concerts. Other events are culturally themed such as the "Dancing and Singing in Asia minor" event. Another event which featured at the Music School of Rhodes Island was the "Music Stand" event which took viewers into Alexandros Papadiamantis' word of romantic short stories. The Music School of Rhodes also hold a music festival every year in which its students get to take part in the

Music Festival
The music school, along with the Department of the Dodecanese of the South Aegean Region and the Municipal Culture Sports Organisation of the Municipality of Rhodes (DOPAR), is set to be hosting a festival showcasing the Creation of Contemporary Music. The main purpose of the event is to allow young musicians to express themselves and show their talents by providing them with the best possible opportunity for expression. All that is required to allow students to perform at the festival is that they have passed the music audition before the festival begins. This festival is the 3rd of its kind following the success of the 2nd festival which was organised by the Region of Southern Aegean, Department of Culture, and took place in 2011.

The 2nd Festival of Contemporary Music Creation lasted 2 days and consisted of 25 bands, consisting of the Dodecanese, performing over the 2 days. The 1st festival, lasting only 1 day, brought 1000 spectators and the 2nd festival brought more than 1500 spectators over the 2 days it ran for. The reason as to why the music school itself was chosen to hold all 3 of the festivals is due to the fact that its location combines historical monuments and natural beauty providing the perfect backdrop to the festivals.

The 3rd festival of the Creation of Contemporary Music is divided into 3 phases. The 1st phase involves the students, who wish for their bands to participate, submitting applications for performing in the festival. The 2nd phase is where the bands are invited to the hearing in the Music School's auditorium where they perform in front of The Arts Committee of the festival. The committee then evaluate each band determining whether or not they reach the artistic criteria required to move on to the 3rd phase. The 3rd phase involves all of the groups who the Arts Committee determined suitable being given their performance slots. The Arts Committee use the 3 phases to achieve their goal in ensuring the hard working bands are able to go on to perform at the festival and showcase their talents.

Other projects

The school's computer department produced a 3D game in 2012 called Rollit! which is available online to play. 
Students Kalogerakis Alexander, Kapsimalis Panagiotis and Ntitsef Theodore from class C worked together to create the 3D game using Unity3d javascript. The game requires the players to make their way through a maze, collecting flags and then reaching the levels exit before time runs out.

References

External links
 Official Music School of Rhodes website

Rhodes
Culture of Rhodes